Ernie J. Reid (c. 1905 – c. 1938) was a rugby union player who represented Australia.

Reid, a centre, claimed a total of 3 international rugby caps for Australia.

References

Published sources
 Howell, Max (2006) Born to Lead - Wallaby Test Captains (2005) Celebrity Books, New Zealand

Australian rugby union players
Australia international rugby union players
Year of birth uncertain
Rugby union centres